The 2014 European Parliament election in Romania was held in Romania on 25 May 2014.

Candidates and elected MEPs
For the PSD – UNPR –  PC:
 Corina Crețu
 Ecaterina Andronescu
 Cătălin Ivan
 Dan Nica
 Maria Grapini – PC
 Damian Drăghici – UNPR
 Daciana Sârbu
 Ioan-Mircea Pașcu
 Vasilica Dăncilă
 Ionel Moisă
 Victor Boștinaru
 Claudiu-Ciprian Tănăsescu
 Doru-Claudian Frunzulică – UNPR
 Constantin-Laurențiu Rebega – PC
 Ana-Claudia Țapardel
 Andi-Lucian Cristea

For the National Liberal Party (PNL):
 Norica Nicolai
 Adina Vălean
 Ramona Mănescu
 Cristian Bușoi
 Renate Weber
 Eduard HellvigFor the Democratic Liberal Party (PDL): Theodor Stolojan
 Monica Macovei
 Traian Ungreanu
 Marian-Jean Marinescu
 Daniel BudaIndependent candidate: Mircea DiaconuFor the Democratic Alliance of Hungarians in Romania (UDMR): Iuliu Winkler
 Csaba SógorFor the People's Movement Party (PMP):''
 Cristian Preda
 Siegfried Mureșan

Results

References

External links
 Central Electoral Bureau for the European Parliament Elections

Romania
European Parliament elections in Romania
May 2014 events in Romania
2014 elections in Romania